Samuel Roland Buxton (February 10, 1874 – November 9, 1951) was the mayor of Newport News, Virginia from September 1, 1904 to September 1, 1908. He was born in Jackson, North Carolina and attended Wake Forest College. Later, he was instrumental, as part of a "Central Community Committee," of attracting interest in a memorial arch to recognize American troops returning home from the First World War. This arch became the Newport News Victory Arch.

His son, Samuel R. Buxton, Jr., served as a judge in the Newport News Circuit Court from 1968 to 1977. He died at his daughter's home in El Paso, Texas in 1951.

References

Mayors of Newport News, Virginia
1874 births
1951 deaths